La Brava is a lake in the eastearn part of the Balcarce Partido in Buenos Aires Province, Argentina. Located within Mount La Brava, the lake area is privately owned, although open to the public for fishing and camping. There are several campsites around the lake, like Ruca Lauquen on the east coast and the Fishing Club Balcarce on the north, both of them with recreational facilities and boat piers. The lake is described as a rift lake or tectonic lake, probably a natural reservoir formed by dunes. La Brava is the habitat of a number of bird species, like swans, ducks, coots, herons and gulls. Capybaras and otters dwell in its shores. The lake also support a fish community dominated by the silverside and the dentudo. The landscape has been compared with that of the lakes of western Patagonia.

See also
Laguna de los Padres
Sierra de los Padres

Notes

Lakes of Buenos Aires Province
Tourist attractions in Buenos Aires Province
Tourist attractions in Mar del Plata